Bowling competitions at the 2022 South American Games in Asunción, Paraguay were held between October 9 and 12, 2022 at the Strike Bowling.

Schedule
The competition schedule is as follows:

Medal summary

Medal table

Medalists

Participation
Twelve nations participated in bowling of the 2022 South American Games.

References

Bowling
South American Games
2022